Vysočany (German: Wissotschan) is a part of Prague in the Prague 9 administrative district (partly in Prague 3), Czech Republic. It lays in the eastern part of Prague around the valley with Rokytka river.

History 
The first recorded information about Vysočany is from 1115 when the duke Vladislav I. gave Vysočany vineyards to Kladruby monastery. 
In 1896 - Emil Kolben - important Czech engineer and entrepreneur (former employee and friend of Thomas Edison) founded its factory which later became famous ČKD. This strongly influenced Vysočany as a heavily industrial district of Prague. 
In the year 1902 - the emperor Franz Joseph I of Austria awarded Vysočany with the title of city and the right to use its coat of arms. 
1911 - Vysočany Town Hall was built
In 1922 - Vysočany became part of Prague. 
In 1939 - after Nazi invasion of Prague. The majority of industrial production had to be refocused on military production to support Nazi-Germany war
In 1942 - several families from Vysočany were involved in the Operation Anthropoid (assassination of Reinhard Heydrich) 
In 1945 - during the end of World War II the district was heavily damaged during the Bombing of Prague. The targets were factories which were forced to produce military material. 
In 1968 - after the invasion of Russian armies - there was a special convention of the Czechoslovak Communist Party held in Vysočany which strongly condemned the invasion of the Soviet armies. 
Since 1990s - the new era after Velvet Revolution saw Vysočany transforming from heavily industrial district to new modern residential part of Prague. Big part of construction is focused on the "brown-fields" after former factories.

Infrastructure 
Vysočany has 2 metro stations on the line B: Vysočanská and Kolbenova.
2 train stations (Praha-Vysočany and Praha-Libeň). 
The oldest airport in Prague Kbely lies partly in Vysočany.

Interesting facts 
The tallest residential building in the Czech Republic Rezidence Eliška is in Vysočany. 
Vineyard Máchalka is the only one left in the almost 1000 year history of vine production in Vysočany. It was renewed in 1998.
Part of Pragovka factory was rebuild to an artist/community center
The largest flea market in Prague is in Vysočany district in the U Elektry street.
O2_Arena_(Prague) with the shopping mall Galerie Harfa and Harfa Business District is generally considered as Vysočany although officially lies in Libeň district.

References

External links

 -- Official site of the Prague 9

Districts of Prague